Sante Marie is a comune and town in the province of L'Aquila, in the Abruzzo region of central Italy

It is served by a station on the Rome-Pescara railroad.

References

 
Marsica